Mark Stewart may refer to:

Mark MacTaggart-Stewart (1834–1923), Scottish politician
Mark Stewart (American football) (born 1959), football player
Mark Stewart (artist) (born 1951), watercolor artist
Mark Stewart (baseball) (1889–1932), American baseball player
Mark Stewart (American musician), New York City based multi-instrumentalist
Mark Stewart (footballer) (born 1988), Scottish footballer
Mark Stewart (English musician) (born 1960),  founding member of The Pop Group
Mark Stewart (album)
Mark Stewart (politician) (born 1979), Queensland MP
Stew (musician) (born 1961), singer/songwriter from Los Angeles
Mark Stewart (cyclist) (born 1995), Scottish track cyclist
Mark Stewart (rugby union), Scottish rugby union player

See also
Mark Stuart (disambiguation)